The 18th New York State Legislature, consisting of the New York State Senate and the New York State Assembly, met from January 6 to April 9, 1795, during the eighteenth year of George Clinton's governorship, first in Poughkeepsie, then in New York City.

Background
Under the provisions of the New York Constitution of 1777, the State Senators were elected on general tickets in the senatorial districts, and were then divided into four classes. Six senators each drew lots for a term of 1, 2, 3 or 4 years and, beginning at the election in April 1778, every year six Senate seats came up for election to a four-year term. Assemblymen were elected countywide on general tickets to a one-year term, the whole assembly being renewed annually.

In March 1786, the Legislature enacted that future Legislatures meet on the first Tuesday of January of each year unless called earlier by the governor. No general meeting place was determined, leaving it to each Legislature to name the place where to reconvene, and if no place could be agreed upon, the Legislature should meet again where it adjourned.

On February 7, 1791, the Legislature re-apportioned the Senate and Assembly districts, according to the figures of the 1790 United States Census.

At this time the politicians were divided into two opposing political parties: the Federalists and the Democratic-Republicans.

Elections
The State election was held from April 29 to May 1, 1794. Senators Matthew Clarkson (Southern D.), John Williams (Eastern D.), John Frey and Stephen Van Rensselaer (both Western D.) were re-elected. Assemblymen Richard Hatfield (Southern D.) and John D. Coe (Middle D.) were also elected to the Senate.

Sessions

The Legislature met first in Poughkeepsie on January 6; and adjourned on January 14, 1795. The Legislature met again at Federal Hall in New York City on January 20; and adjourned on April 9.

William North was elected Speaker with 33 votes to 28 for James Watson, the Speaker of the previous Assembly, both were Federalists. The average vote for the members of the Council of Appointment was 36 to 29, showing a Federalist majority of 7.

On January 27, the Legislature re-elected Federalist Rufus King to the U.S. Senate.

State Senate

Districts
The Southern District (8 seats) consisted of Kings, New York, Queens, Richmond, Suffolk and Westchester counties.
The Middle District (6 seats) consisted of Dutchess, Orange and Ulster counties.
The Eastern District (5 seats) consisted of Washington, Clinton, Columbia and Rensselaer counties.
The Western District (5 seats) consisted of Albany, Montgomery, Herkimer, Ontario, Otsego, Saratoga, Tioga and Onondaga counties.

Note: There are now 62 counties in the State of New York. The counties which are not mentioned in this list had not yet been established, or sufficiently organized, the area being included in one or more of the abovementioned counties.

Members
The asterisk (*) denotes members of the previous Legislature who continued in office as members of this Legislature. Richard Hatfield and John D. Coe changed from the Assembly to the Senate.

Employees
Clerk: Abraham B. Bancker

State Assembly

Districts

The City and County of Albany (7 seats)
Columbia County (6 seats)
Dutchess County (7 seats)
Herkimer and Onondaga counties (1 seat)
Kings County (1 seat)
Montgomery County (4 seats)
The City and County of New York (7 seats)
Ontario County (1 seat)
Orange County (3 seats)
Otsego County (1 seat)
Queens County (3 seats)
Rensselaer County (5 seats)
Richmond County (1 seat)
Saratoga County (4 seats) 
Suffolk County (4 seats)
Tioga County (1 seat)
Ulster County (5 seats)
Washington and Clinton counties (4 seats)
Westchester County (5 seats)

Note: There are now 62 counties in the State of New York. The counties which are not mentioned in this list had not yet been established, or sufficiently organized, the area being included in one or more of the abovementioned counties.

Assemblymen
The asterisk (*) denotes members of the previous Legislature who continued as members of this Legislature. David Pye changed from the Senate to the Assembly.

Employees
Clerk: Oliver L. Ker
Doorkeeper: Richard Ten Eyck

Notes

Sources
The New York Civil List compiled by Franklin Benjamin Hough (Weed, Parsons and Co., 1858) [see pg. 108 for Senate districts; pg. 115 for senators; pg. 148f for Assembly districts; pg. 168f for assemblymen]
Election result Assembly, Dutchess Co. at project "A New Nation Votes", compiled by Phil Lampi, hosted by Tufts University Digital Library
Election result Assembly, Rensselaer Co. at project "A New Nation Votes"
Election result Assembly, Ulster Co. at project "A New Nation Votes"
Election result Assembly, Westchester Co. at project "A New Nation Votes"

1794 in New York (state)
1795 in New York (state)
018